A reel is an object around which a length of another material (usually long and flexible) is wound for storage (usually hose are wound around a reel). Generally a reel has a cylindrical core (known as a spool) with flanges around the ends (known as the rims) to retain the material wound around the core. In most cases the core is hollow in order to pass an axle and allow the reel to rotate like a wheel, and crank or handles may exist for manually turning the reel, while others are operated by (typically electric) motors.

Construction

The size of the core is dependent on several factors. A smaller core will obviously allow more material to be stored in a given space. However, there is a limit to how tightly the stored material can be wound without damaging it and this limits how small the core can be.

Other issues affecting the core size include:

 Mechanical strength of the core (especially with big reels)
 Acceptable turning speed (for a given rate of material moving on or off the reel a smaller core will mean that an almost empty reel has to turn faster)
 any functional requirements of the core e.g.
 For a reel that must be mechanically turned the size of the grips that mount it on the mechanical turning device.
 The size of the mountings needed to support the core during unwinding.
 Anything mounted on the cores (e.g. the sockets on an extension reel)

With material such as photographic film that is flat and long but is relatively wide, the material generally is stored in successive single layers. In cases where the material is more uniform in cross-section (for example, a cable), the material may be safely wound around a reel that is wider than its width. In this case, several windings are needed to create a layer on the reel.

Uses

Examples of reel usage include:
 Hose reels that store and prevent kinking of fire hoses or garden hoses
 Bobbins that hold yarns or threads for sewing machines and weavers
 Retractable tape measures
 Fishing reels that store and pull in fishing lines when angling
 Film reels that carry film stocks
 Many audio recordings of the late 20th century (and some today) use reel-to-reel magnetic tape
 Kite lines are frequently operated from reels
 Specialized reels for holding tow line for hang glider, glider, and sailplane launching
 Laying of communications cables use giant reels
 Winches that wind cables/chains for sails or anchors on ships
 Windlasses that are used to wind and pull rope or chains in order to lift weights on implements such as a crane, a well or a drawbridge 
 Webbing barriers that allow mobile post positions collect tensionally excess webbing
 Tow trucks hold steel cable on reels
 Rope, wire and electrical cable is often supplied on reels
 Badge reels are used to hold access badges, smart cards and other externally tethered small items such as keys and clippers
 A cave diving reel is a safety equipment used for running a distance line

Motion picture terminology

It is traditional to discuss the length of theatrical motion pictures in terms of "reels". Most films have visible cues which mark the end of the reel. This allows projectionists running reel-to-reel to change over to the next reel on the other projector.

Most modern projectionists use the term "reel" when referring to a  "two-reeler", as modern films are rarely shipped by single  reels. A standard Hollywood movie averages about five 2,000-foot reels in length.

The "reel" was established as a standard measurement because of considerations in printing motion picture film at a film laboratory, for shipping (especially the film case sizes) and for the size of the physical film magazine attached to the motion picture projector. It runs, at sound speed, approximately the same amount of time (11–12 minutes) as a  35 mm reel.

A "split reel" is a motion picture film reel in two halves that, when assembled, hold a specific length of motion picture film that has been wound on a plastic core. Using a split reel allows film to be shipped or handled in a lighter and smaller form than film would on a "fixed" reel. In silent film terminology, two films on one reel.

As digital cinema catches on, the physical reel is being replaced by a virtual format called Digital Cinema Package, which can be distributed using any storage medium (such as hard drives) or data transfer medium (such as the internet or satellite links) and projected using a digital projector instead of a conventional movie projector.

A newsreel is a short documentary film.

A showreel or demo reel is a short film showcasing a person's or organization's previous work.

See also
 Spindle (tool)

References

External links 
 

Bulk material handling
Film and video terminology
Packaging
Portable tools